The Twinkle in God's Eye is a 1955 American Western film directed by George Blair and written by P.J. Wolfson. The film stars Mickey Rooney, Coleen Gray, Hugh O'Brian, Joey Forman, Don "Red" Barry and Mike Connors. The film was released on October 13, 1955, by Republic Pictures.

Plot
A newly ordained minister, Rev. Macklin, catches a ride to the town of Lodestone in a stagecoach carrying six dancehall girls. They are on their way to work for saloon owner Marty Callahan, including one, Laura, who once loved Callahan but no longer does.

Macklin explains that his father once built a church in this town, but it burned to the ground. He now wants to rebuild it, but Callahan is opposed and persuades others not to help the preacher in any way. Only the saloon girls attend his first service.

A gang of outlaws led by one called Lou robs the saloon and hides the loot in the church. Lou and his men pretend to be religious converts until an opportunity can arise to retrieve their money. Macklin, trying to raise money, enters a rodeo and wins a $300 prize, but Laura also competes, is thrown from a bronco and ends up in a wheelchair.

Macklin befriends a band of Indians, who assist in his endeavors. Lou sincerely does become a convert and even Callahan has a change of heart when Macklin returns the stolen money. Laura, seeing a new side of Callahan, agrees to marry him, so Macklin conducts their wedding.

Cast
Mickey Rooney as Rev. William Macklin II
Coleen Gray as Laura
Hugh O'Brian as Marty Callahan
Joey Forman as Ted
Don "Red" Barry as Dawson 
Mike Connors as Lou 
Jil Jarmyn as Millie
Kem Dibbs as Johnny
Tony Garcen as Babe
Raymond Hatton as Stable man
Ruta Lee as Ruthie

References

External links
 

1955 films
Republic Pictures films
American Western (genre) films
1955 Western (genre) films
Films directed by George Blair
1950s English-language films
1950s American films
American black-and-white films